Frank Pellegrino may refer to:

Frank P. Pellegrino (1901–1975), American businessman and philanthropist
Frank Pellegrino (inventor) (1923–2008), American engineer, inventor, and industrialist
Frank Pellegrino (actor) (1944–2017), American actor and restaurateur